Doe Run is an unincorporated community in Wicomico County, Maryland, United States.

Notes

Unincorporated communities in Wicomico County, Maryland
Unincorporated communities in Maryland